The Chisholm Trail Coliseum is an 8,000-seat multi-purpose arena located at the Garfield County Fairgrounds in Enid, Oklahoma. The coliseum, also called the Garfield County Expo Center was built in 1998.  It was home to the Oklahoma Storm USBL basketball team, and also serves as a site for various conventions. In late April 2009, the Coliseum suffered damage when it was hit by an EF2 tornado, and again in August 2011 when a 96 mph wind storm hit Enid.

References

Indoor arenas in Oklahoma
Sports venues in Oklahoma
Basketball venues in Oklahoma
Buildings and structures in Enid, Oklahoma
1998 establishments in Oklahoma
Sports venues completed in 1998